Daniela Esposito is an Italian ten-pin bowler. She finished in 20th position of the combined rankings at the 2006 AMF World Cup.

References

Living people
Year of birth missing (living people)
Italian ten-pin bowling players
Place of birth missing (living people)
21st-century Italian women